The 1985 Baylor Bears football team represented the Baylor University in the 1985 NCAA Division I-A football season.  The Bears finished the season second in the Southwest Conference to Texas A&M, although Baylor won the head-to-head matchup with the Aggies that season.  A highlight of the season included a win at USC in week 3 when the Trojans were ranked in the top 5.

Schedule

Roster

Game summaries

Wyoming

at Georgia

at No. 3 USC

Texas Tech

Texas A&M

at No. 12 Arkansas

Source:

vs No. 12 LSU (Liberty Bowl)

Rankings

References

Baylor
Baylor Bears football seasons
Liberty Bowl champion seasons
Baylor Bears football